The 1983 Alan King Tennis Classic, also known as the Alan King-Caesars Palace Tennis Classic, was a men's tennis tournament played on outdoor hard courts at the Caesars Palace in Las Vegas, United States. It was the 12th edition of the event and was part of the 1983 Volvo Grand Prix circuit. The tournament was held from April 18 through April 24, 1983. First-seeded Jimmy Connors won the singles title and the accompanying $62,500 first-prize money. It was Connors' second consecutive singles title at the tournament and the fourth in total.

Finals

Singles
 Jimmy Connors defeated  Mark Edmondson 7–6(7–4), 6–1
 It was Connors' 2nd singles title of the year and the 98th of his career.

Doubles
 Steve Denton /  Kevin Curren defeated  Tracy Delatte /  Johan Kriek 6–3, 7–5

References

External links
 International Tennis Federation (ITF) tournament edition details

Alan King Tennis Classic
Alan King Tennis Classic
Tennis in Las Vegas
Alan King Tennis Classic
Alan King Tennis Classic
Alan King Tennis Classic